Jahan (also Romanized as Jahān) is a village in Bam Rural District, Bam and Safiabad District, Esfarayen County, North Khorasan Province, Iran. At the 2006 census, its population was 915, in 218 families.

History

According to archaeological research in the field has been living in this old Rvstaanjam Astqrardr the area dates back about 2500 years ago.
At the time of the Achaemenid family may have lived in the castle known as Shah Jahan Qzlrqlh.Since the emergence of the newly established village there is a lot of information.
Its appearance may be abandoned after the demolition of the old Village of the world
Documented historical name of the village has been called the world that happens to the Timurid period. His eyebrows in 833 AD. AH of the 12 villages mentioned Arghyan Arghyan pass to the world one of these villages are listed: Rueen village and functions، Ardin village and functions،Dastger village and functions ،Karizdar village،Bekrabad village،Nahamod village،Jahan village and functions ،Ban village and functions ،Sfanj village and functions ،Khargh village and functions.....

People 

 زبان مردم روستای جهان ترکی میباشد

Antiquities of the village

References 

Populated places in Esfarayen County